Deportivo Alavés Gloriosas is a Spanish women's football team from Vitoria-Gasteiz, Álava, Basque Country, currently playing in the Liga F. It is the women's section of Deportivo Alavés.

History
Having begun the process of adding a women's football section to the club structure in the months prior, in summer 2017 Alavés had their new Gloriosas team installed directly into the second tier of the Spanish league setup as the result of a merger with established local club CD Gasteizko Neskak (Vitoria Girls) who had just completed a season competing at that level.

Under the agreement, the Gasteizko Neskak senior team's players were adopted by Alavés and now play home matches at the professional club's Ciudad Deportiva José Luis Compañón (Ibaia) training ground, wearing Alavés colours. Dafne Triviño, the long-serving coach and coordinator of Gasteizko Neskak, was appointed as the women's section coordinator for Alavés.

During the first season following the merger, the Gloriosas team often continued to be referred to as Gasteizko Neskak.

Alavés previously had a women's team, in partnership with Club San Ignacio (not to be confused with SD San Ignacio of Bilbao), from 2010 to 2013.

In summer 2019, the club confirmed they would be introducing a women's reserve team in the provincial leagues to act as a step between the youth and senior levels.

In the 2020–21 season, played in a two-phase format due to the COVID-19 pandemic in Spain, Alavés held off a challenge from Osasuna to win both the winter and spring regional groups and gain promotion to the Primera División for the first time.

Alavés competed in the Copa de la Reina for the first time in the 2021–22 season after the competition was opened up to all clubs in the top division and the level below; they entered at the third round stage but lost to Espanyol, one of the teams relegated at the end of the previous campaign.

Gasteiz Cup and Gasteizko Neskak

Gasteizko Neskak, who wear pink-and-black and are based at the Betoño Sports Complex (also used by Alavés for training), continue to operate independently, with a second adult team in the Territorial Femenina Araba league (fourth level) as well as their existing youth teams, with support from Alavés as a 'partner club' in exchange for continued access to players.

For several years the organisation was known as CDF Gasteiz Cup, with the club hierarchy also arranging an annual youth tournament of the same name which attracted entrants from as far away as India – it was played for 18 years, the last edition held in 2014.

After winning the Preferente Álava league in 2010, Gasteiz Cup reached the Primera Nacional (second tier) in the 2010–11 season, finishing bottom of the table in their group. They are regular participants in international youth tournaments such as the Gothia Cup in Sweden. Yulema Corres, who won the Spanish league in 2016 with Athletic Bilbao, began her career with the club.

Season by season

Players

Current squad

Honours
CDF Gasteizko Cup
Álava Territorial League: 2008–09, 2009–10

Alavés-San Ignacio
Álava Territorial League: 2011–12

Gasteizko Neskak
Basque Regional League: 2015–16

Alavés Gloriosas
Segunda División Pro: 2020–21 (north section)

See also
 :Category:Deportivo Alavés Gloriosas players

References

External links
 Team profile at Futbolme
Alavés at Txapeldunak

Women's football clubs in Spain
Deportivo Alavés
1995 establishments in Spain
Football clubs in the Basque Country (autonomous community)
Sport in Vitoria-Gasteiz
Segunda Federación (women) clubs
Primera División (women) clubs
Association football clubs established in 1995